Committee on Finance or Finance Committee may refer to:

Board of Finance in New England local government (with varying titles outside Connecticut)
Canadian Senate Standing Committee on National Finance, a standing committee of the Senate of Canada
Canadian House of Commons Standing Committee on Finance
Finance Committee (French National Assembly)
Finance Committee (House of Commons), a committee of the House of Commons of the United Kingdom
Finance Committee (House of Lords), a committee of the House of Lords of the United Kingdom
Finance Committee (Sweden), a committee of the Riksdag
United States Senate Committee on Finance, a standing committee of the United States Senate